Anexodus aquilus is a species of beetle in the family Cerambycidae. It was described by Francis Polkinghorne Pascoe in 1886. It is known from Borneo.

References

Morimopsini
Beetles described in 1886